This is a list of schools in the Metropolitan Borough of Bury in the English county of Greater Manchester.

State-funded schools

Primary schools

All Saints' CE Primary School, Whitefield
Bury and Whitefield Jewish Primary School, Unsworth
Butterstile Primary School, Prestwich
Cams Lane Primary School, Radcliffe
Chantlers Primary School, Bury
Chapelfield Primary School, Radcliffe
Chesham Primary School, Bury
Christ Church Ainsworth CE Primary School, Ainsworth
Christ Church CE Primary School, Walshaw
East Ward Community Primary School, Bury
Elton Community Primary School, Bury
Emmanuel Holcombe CE Primary School, Holcombe
Fairfield Community Primary School, Bury
Gorsefield Primary School, Radcliffe
Greenhill Primary School, Bury
Greenmount Primary School, Greenmount
Guardian Angels RC Primary School, Elton
Hazlehurst Community Primary School, Ramsbottom
Heaton Park Primary School, Whitefield
Higher Lane Primary School, Whitefield
Holcombe Brook Primary School, Holcombe Brook
Hollins Grundy Primary School, Hollins
Holly Mount RC Primary School, Greenmount
Holy Trinity Primary School, Bury
Lowercroft Primary School, Bury
Mersey Drive Community Primary School, Whitefield
Old Hall Primary School, Brandlesholme
Our Lady of Grace RC Primary School, Prestwich
Our Lady of Lourdes RC Primary School, Bury
Park View Primary School, Prestwich
Peel Brow School, Ramsbottom
Radcliffe Hall CE Primary School, Radcliffe
Radcliffe Primary School, Radcliffe
Ribble Drive Community Primary School, Whitefield
St Andrew's CE Primary School, Radcliffe
St Andrew's CE Primary School, Ramsbottom
St Bernadette’s RC Primary School, Whitefield
St Hilda's CE Primary School, Prestwich
St John with St Mark CE Primary School, Bury
St John's CE Primary School, Radcliffe
St Joseph and St Bede RC Primary School, Bury
St Joseph's RC Primary School, Ramsbottom
St Luke CE Primary School, Bury
St Margaret's CE Primary School, Prestwich
St Marie's RC Primary School, Bury
St Mary's CE Primary School, Hawkshaw
St Mary's CE Primary School, Prestwich
St Mary's RC Primary School, Radcliffe
St Michael's RC Primary School, Whitefield
St Paul's CE Primary School, Bury
St Peter's CE Primary School, Bury
St Stephen's CE Primary School, Bury
St Thomas's CE Primary School, Bury
Sedgley Park Community Primary School, Prestwich
Springside Primary School, Bury
Summerseat Methodist Primary School, Summerseat
Sunny Bank Primary School, Bury
Tottington Primary School, Tottington
Unsworth Primary School, Unsworth
Wesley Methodist Primary School, Radcliffe
Whitefield Community Primary School, Whitefield
Woodbank Primary School, Bury
Yesoiday Hatorah Boys Academy, Prestwich
Yesoiday Hatorah Girls Academy, Prestwich

Secondary schools

Bury CE High School, Bury
Derby High School, Bury
Elton High School, Bury
Hazel Wood High School, Bury
The Heys School, Prestwich
Manchester Mesivta School, Prestwich
Parrenthorn High School, Prestwich
Philips High School, Whitefield
St Gabriel's RC High School, Bury
St Monica's High School, Prestwich
Tottington High School, Tottington
Unsworth Academy, Unsworth
Woodhey High School, Ramsbottom

Special and alternative schools
Bury Secondary PRU Spring Lane School, Radcliffe
Cloughside College, Prestwich
Elms Bank, Whitefield
Millwood Primary Special School, Radcliffe

Further education
Bury College, Bury
Holy Cross College, Bury

Independent schools

Primary and preparatory schools
Bury Catholic Preparatory School, Bury
Prestwich Preparatory School, Prestwich

Senior and all-through schools
Bury Grammar School (Boys), Bury
Bury Grammar School (Girls), Bury
Darul Uloom Al-Arabiyyah Al-Islamiyyah, Holcombe

Special and alternative schools
Cambian Chesham House School, Bury
Craig Ormerod Associates, Radcliffe
Excel and Exceed Centre, Bury
Mill School, Bury
Pennine House School, Bury
Woodlands, Edenfield

References

 Bury Local Authority Schools
 Ofsted (Office for Standards in Education)

 
Bury